Julia Machin (née Bennett, born 26 March 1970) is an English high jumper who competes for Epsom and Ewell Harriers. She won at the 1990 UK Championships and the 1994 AAA Championships, and competed at the Commonwealth Games in 1994 and 2006. She achieved her best of 1.92 metres on 6 March 1990, when winning at the AAA Indoor Championships at the age of just 19. Her outdoor best of 1.89 metres was set on 11 June 1994, when winning the AAA title. Having cleared 1.88m aged 35 in 2005, she went on to break the British masters age 40+ record with 1.78m in 2010, and to equal the British masters 45+ record with 1.65m in 2016. She also has a Heptathlon best of 5747 (1996) and an indoor Pentathlon best of 4297 (1998). The latter score (as of 2022) ranks her 10th on the British all-time list.

International competitions

References

1970 births
Living people
British female high jumpers
English female high jumpers
Commonwealth Games competitors for England
Athletes (track and field) at the 1994 Commonwealth Games
Athletes (track and field) at the 2006 Commonwealth Games
British pentathletes
British heptathletes
English heptathletes